= Richs Run =

Stream in Ohio, U.S.

Coordinates: 39°29′19″N 84°01′53″W

Richs Run is a stream in the U.S. state of Ohio.

Richs Run was named in honor of a local family.
